Three Japanese destroyers have been named Ōnami:

 , a Yūgumo-class destroyer of the Imperial Japanese Navy during World War II
 , a Takanami-class destroyer of the JMSDF

Japanese Navy ship names
Japan Maritime Self-Defense Force ship names